Leptospermum polygalifolium, commonly known as tantoon, jellybush or yellow tea tree, is a species of shrub or tree of the family Myrtaceae that is endemic to eastern Australia, including Lord Howe Island. It has thin bark, elliptical leaves, white flowers arranged singly on short side shoots and fruit that remain on the plant for a few years.

Description
Younger stems are covered with short hairs at first and have a conspicuous flange near the leaf bases. The flowers are white, greenish, cream-coloured or sometimes pink, mostly  in diameter and are arranged singly on short side shoots. There are dark reddish-brown bracts and similar bracteoles at the base of the young flower buds but that are shed as the bud develops.

Taxonomy and naming
Leptospermum polygalifolium was first described by Richard Salisbury in 1797 from a specimen collected in Port Jackson. The description was published in Salisbury's book, Prodromus Stirpium in Horto ad Chapel Allerton Vigentium. The specific epithet (polygalifolium) is a reference to the genus Polygala, with the ending -folium from the Latin -folius meaning "-leaved".

Subspecies
In 1989, Joy Thompson described six subspecies and the names are accepted by the Australian Plant Census:
Leptospermum polygalifolium subsp. tropicum Joy Thomps. has leaves  x  and occurs from Cooktown to Keppel Bay in Queensland.

References

polygalifolium
Myrtales of Australia
Flora of New South Wales
Plants described in 1797
Taxa named by Richard Anthony Salisbury